Maurice Besnier (29 September 1873, Paris – 4 March 1933, Caen) was a French historian, who specialised in ancient geography and topography.

Former member of the École française de Rome, he became the 34th professor of ancient history, epigraphy and archeology of the Faculté des Lettres de Caen. He was named as chair of ancient geography at the École pratique des hautes études in 1920, and in 1924 became a member of the Académie des Inscriptions et Belles-Lettres. He contributed to the Pauly-Wissowa and to the Dictionnaire des Antiquités.

Selected writings 
 with Paul Blanchet: Musées et collections archéologiques de l’Algérie et de la Tunisie. Collection Farges. Paris 1900
 L’Île Tibérine dans l’antiquité. Paris 1902
 De regione Paelignorum. Paris 1902
 Géographie ancienne du Maroc. Paris 1904
 Les catacombes de Rome. Rom 1909
 Histoire des fouilles de Vieux (Calvados). In: Mémoires de la Société nationale des Antiquaires de France. 69. Jahrgang, 7. Folge, Band 99 (1909), pp. 225–335
 Lexique de geographie ancienne. Paris 1914
 L’Empire Romain de l’avènement des Sévères au Concile de Nicée. Paris 1937

Bibliography 
 Ferdinand Brunot: Éloge funèbre de M. Maurice Besnier, correspondant français de l’Académie. In: Comptes rendus de l'Académie des inscriptions et belles-lettres. 1933, pp. 118–120 (Volltext).
 Marcel Durry: Revue des questions historiques. 118 (1934), p. 51 ff.
 Stefan Heid: Maurice Besnier. In Stefan Heid, Martin Dennert: Personenlexikon zur Christlichen Archäologie. Forscher und Persönlichkeiten vom 16. bis zum 21. Jahrhundert. Schnell & Steiner, Regensburg 2012, Bd. 1, p. 174.
 Raymond Lantier: Maurice Besnier. In: Revue archéologique. 6. Folge, 1 (1933), pp. 237-239.
 David M. Robinson: Necrology Maurice Besnier. In: American Journal of Archaeology. vol. 38 (1934), p. 285.

External links 
Obituary

20th-century French historians
Historians of antiquity
French scholars of Roman history
École Normale Supérieure alumni
Academic staff of the École pratique des hautes études
Historical geographers
1873 births
1933 deaths
Scientists from Paris
Members of the Académie des Inscriptions et Belles-Lettres